The H. B. Robinson Steam Electric Plant, also known as Robinson Nuclear Plant, is a nuclear power plant located near Hartsville, South Carolina. The plant consists of one Westinghouse 759 MW pressurized water reactor. The site once included a coal-fired unit that generated 174 MW (which was retired in October 2012 and demolished 2016) and a combustion turbine unit that generated 15 MW.

The Robinson plant is named for H. Burton Robinson, a former executive vice president of Carolina Power & Light.  The plant is located adjacent to the  Lake Robinson.
The Robinson nuclear unit was the first commercial nuclear power plant in the southeastern United States and was then the largest such in the world.

Electricity Production

Surrounding population

The 2010 U.S. population within  of Robinson was 32,675, an increase of 2.6 percent in a decade, according to an analysis of U.S. Census data for msnbc.com. The 2010 U.S. population within  was 893,536, an increase of 10.3 percent since 2000. Cities within 50 miles include Columbia (49 miles to city center).

Environmental Impact Statement
NUREG-1437, "Generic Environmental Impact Statement for License Renewal of Nuclear Plants," Supplement 13, Regarding H.B. Robinson Steam Electric Plant, Unit No. 2, was published by the Nuclear Regulatory Commission (NRC) in December 2003.

This supplement documents the NRC staff's review of the environmental issues at Robinson, Unit 2 in support of Carolina Power & Light Company's (CP&L) application for license renewal of that facility. The supplement was prepared in accordance with 10 CFR 51.71. This supplemental environmental impact statement includes the staff's analysis that considers and weighs the environmental effects of the proposed action, the environmental impacts of alternatives to the proposed action, and alternatives available for reducing or avoiding adverse impacts. It also includes the staff's recommendation regarding the proposed actions.

Safety Evaluation Report
The NRC staff reviewed the Robinson license renewal application for compliance with the requirements of Title 10 of the Code of Federal Regulations, Part 54, "Requirements for Renewal of Operating Licenses for Nuclear Power Plants," and prepared this report to document its findings.  The document was first issued in August 2003, as "Safety Evaluation Report with Open Items Related to the License Renewal of H.B. Robinson, Unit 2".  The report is available in ADAMS under accession number ML032370382.

In March 2004, the report "Safety Evaluation Report - Related to the License Renewal of the H. B. Robinson Steam Electric Plant, Unit 2," was issued as NUREG-1785.  The report is also available in ADAMS under accession number ML040200981.

Ownership 
The operator and owner is Duke Energy Progress, LLC, a wholly owned subsidiary of Duke Energy. Formerly the plant was owned and operated by Progress Energy Inc and Carolina Power & Light.

Seismic risk
The Nuclear Regulatory Commission's estimate of the risk each year of an earthquake intense enough to cause core damage to the reactor at Robinson was 1 in 66,667, according to an NRC study published in August 2010.

References

External links

 Robinson operating license
NukeWorker

Energy infrastructure completed in 1971
Nuclear power plants in South Carolina
Buildings and structures in Darlington County, South Carolina
Towers in South Carolina
Nuclear power stations using pressurized water reactors
Hartsville, South Carolina